A BNC (short for Bounced Network Connection) is a piece of software that is used to relay traffic and connections in computer networks, much like a proxy. Using a BNC allows a user to hide the original source of the user's connection, providing privacy as well as the ability to route traffic through a specific location. A BNC can also be used to hide the true target to which a user connects.

IRC 

One common usage is over Internet Relay Chat (IRC) via a BNC running on remote servers. In such an environment, where it is very easy to ascertain a user's IP address a BNC may help to hide the original connection source, as well as providing the opportunity for "vhosts" or "virtual hosts". The use of a vhost does not conceal the connection any better but merely adds a statement as the hostname.

Many BNCs remain connected to an IRC server in the event the client should disconnect from the Internet. Often state changes are tracked so that they may be relayed to the client upon reconnection. Some implementations opt to store all messages sent across the network that the client would have normally received and send them upon the client's reconnection; this is often considered to be much too resource dependent for commercial hosting services to provide. Other logging features and bot like functions may be included with various implementations but are not standard.

Example

User A logs onto IRC directly and appears as USER!user@users.reverse.dns
User A logs onto IRC indirectly through a BNC and appears as USER!user@bnc.net

Software 
A list of bouncer software.

 Bip IRC Proxy maintains a persistent connection and shows a backlog on reconnect.
 bnc is the original IRC bouncer.
 ezbounce's features include password protection, remote administration, logging and listening on multiple ports.
 JBouncer for IRC, written in Java. Supports logging.
 muh bnc is a smart and versatile irc-bouncing tool that will also go on IRC as soon as it is launched, guarding or attempting to get one's nick.
 psyBNC is said to be the oldest and most well-known IRC bouncer. It is easy to use, runs on Linux and became popular on FreeBSD, supports IPv4, IPv6, SSL, logging, multiple users and networks etc. Although psyBNC is like any other IRC proxy, it is often installed on compromised systems by the attacker.
 shroudBNC (IRC) supports SSL connections and offers a web interface. 
 ZNC (IRC) is easy to use, supports SSL connections, IPv6 and logging and offers a web interface. It is extendible by modules and scripts in C++, Python, Perl and Tcl.
 Bouncer written in Java is a generic bouncer/proxy. Supports SSL tunneling, Failover and LoadBalancing of destinations.
 dircproxy
 The Lounge acts like a bouncer and a progressive web app (PWA) client combined. It is open source.
 soju is a simple and easy-to-configure IRC bouncer. The project is hosted on SourceHut.

FTP 

BNCs are also often used for File Transfer Protocol (FTP), again to hide the user and server from each other and to route traffic through a specific location. FTP bouncers can be divided into two different categories, entry and traffic.

Entry bouncer acts as a gateway to the server, but it does not hide the existence of the actual server. Entry bouncers, like cubnc, can be used in a multi-server setup for easy access to each server and load balancing. This removes the need to select which FTP server to log into, when trying to access the server farm.

Traffic bouncers relay traffic through the host they are installed on, and when used, it appears as the bouncer is actually the FTP server, thus hiding the real location of the server completely. Multiple traffic bouncers can be installed parallel in order to balance traffic load across different links. Most elaborate bouncers can even bounce secure SSL/TLS connections.

See also 
Proxy
Open proxy

References

External links 
 

Internet privacy software
Computer security software
Internet Relay Chat
Internet Relay Chat bouncers, gateways and proxies